Zemunik Donji is a municipality in Croatia in the Zadar County. According to the 2011 census, there are 2,060 inhabitants, 91% of whom are Croats.

References

External links

Municipalities of Croatia
Populated places in Zadar County